Acrosathe is a genus of stiletto flies in the family Therevidae. There are more than 20 described species in Acrosathe.

Species
These 22 species belong to the genus Acrosathe:

 Acrosathe annulata (Fabricius, 1805)
 Acrosathe baltica Andersson, 1994
 Acrosathe bimaculata (Cole, 1923)
 Acrosathe centralis Yang, 2002
 Acrosathe curvata Lyneborg, 1986
 Acrosathe erberi Lyneborg, 1986
 Acrosathe longipilosa Yang, 2002
 Acrosathe novella (Coquillett, 1893)
 Acrosathe obsoleta Lyneborg, 1986
 Acrosathe otiosa (Coquillett, 1893)
 Acrosathe pacifica (Cole, 1923)
 Acrosathe pallipilosa Yang, Zhang & An, 2003
 Acrosathe parallela Lyneborg, 1986
 Acrosathe polychaeta Yang, 2002
 Acrosathe singularis Yang, 2002
 Acrosathe stylata Lyneborg, 1986
 Acrosathe sybarita (Loew, 1873)
 Acrosathe tashimai Nagatomi & Lyneborg, 1988
 Acrosathe taurica Lyneborg, 1986
 Acrosathe vanduzeei (Cole, 1923)
 Acrosathe vialis (Osten Sacken, 1877)
 Acrosathe yoshikoae Nagatomi & Lyneborg, 1988

References

Further reading

External links

 

Therevidae
Articles created by Qbugbot
Asiloidea genera